The 2018 JBA season was the only season of the Junior Basketball Association (JBA), an American men's professional basketball league. The JBA was designed as an alternative to the National Collegiate Athletic Association (NCAA), allowing high school and junior college players to immediately play professionally. The season began on June 21 and concluded with the JBA Finals on August 12, 2018. After the season concluded, the JBA selected many of its top players to take part in what was originally a 28-game international season against teams from various countries in Europe and Asia. However, an incident in Lithuania lead to a shortening of the event, with teams dropping out of matches and Asian teams cancelling their matches for late 2018 and early 2019 altogether.

Teams 
The 2018 JBA season consisted of eight teams, with each representing an American city and having the nickname "Ballers." Teams did not occupy a specified home arena; instead, every team faced each other in ten different arenas across the United States.

Regular season

Standings

Games

All-Star Event
On August 3, 2018, the JBA hosted their inaugural All-Star Event at the Quest Multisport in Chicago, Illinois. Prior to the All-Star Game, the league hosted a Three-Point Contest and Slam Dunk Contest. Two days before the event, event contestants and All-Star Game selections were officially revealed to the public.

Three-Point Contest

Results

Slam Dunk Contest

Results
{{8TeamBracket
| RD1-seed1=
| RD1-team1=Shaun Lee 
| RD1-score1=45
| RD1-seed2=
| RD1-team2=Anthony Carmon 
| RD1-score2=36
| RD1-seed3=
| RD1-team3=Demolia Peterson 
| RD1-score3=25
| RD1-seed4=
| RD1-team4=Jameer Killing 
| RD1-score4=28
| RD1-seed5=
| RD1-team5=Keshaun Mack 
| RD1-score5=
| RD1-seed6=
| RD1-team6=Shannon Handy 
| RD1-score6=
| RD1-seed7=
| RD1-team7=Nicholas Lovelace 
| RD1-score7=44
| RD1-seed8=
| RD1-team8=Fionn Brown 
| RD1-score8=
| RD2-team1=Shaun Lee 
| RD2-score1=
| RD2-team2=Jameer Killing 
| RD2-score2=
| RD2-team3=Keshaun Mack 
| RD2-score3=
| RD2-team4=Nicholas Lovelace 
| RD2-score4=
| RD3-team1=Shaun Lee 
| RD3-score1=25
| RD3-team2=Nicholas Lovelace 
| RD3-score2=29}}

All-Star Game

Game
LiAngelo Ball of the West All-Stars was named co-most valuable player (MVP) along with Deon Lyle of the East All-Stars. Ball recorded 39 points, 15 rebounds, and 7 assists, while Lyle scored a game-high 51 points. LaMelo Ball also recorded a double-double with 42 points and 17 assists.

Playoffs

Championship bracketVenue:''' Eagle's Nest Arena (Los Angeles, California), Citizens Business Bank Arena (Ontario, California)

Boxscores

Quarterfinals

Semifinals

JBA Finals

International season 
After the JBA Finals, the league selected 14 players to play for the JBA USA Team, which will take part in 28 exhibition games against international competition. The international season began on September 22, 2018, when the JBA USA Team faced the Svendborg Rabbits from Denmark. Los Angeles Ballers head coach Doyle Balthazar served as the JBA USA Team head coach, with Los Angeles assistant coach Rasul Salahuddin and Seattle Ballers head coach Charles O'Bannon assuming assistant roles. The international season was expected to continue in 2019. However, due to a fight LaMelo Ball was involved with against Dzūkija Alytus on October 1, some of the teams that were previously scheduled for the event dropped out of the event, with the international event concluding earlier than the league anticipated. LaMelo later left the team and the league to enter his senior year of high school. In addition to him, a few other also left the team during the tournament.

JBA USA Team roster

International games

Media 
For the 2018 season, the JBA aired games through Facebook Live, including All-Star festivities and playoff matches. Allen Bell and Brandon Williams were the official commentators for the season.

References

External links
 

Junior Basketball Association seasons
JBA